Metallosticha plumbeifasciella is a species of snout moth in the genus Metallosticha. It was described by George Hampson in 1896 and is known from India (including Kolkata, in West Bengal, the type location).

References

Moths described in 1896
Phycitini